The 2022 Città di Como Challenger was a professional tennis tournament played on clay courts. It was the sixteenth edition of the tournament which was part of the 2022 ATP Challenger Tour. It took place in Como, Italy between 29 August and 4 September 2022.

Singles main-draw entrants

Seeds

 1 Rankings are as of 22 August 2022.

Other entrants
The following players received wildcards into the singles main draw:
  Federico Arnaboldi
  Gianmarco Ferrari
  Matteo Gigante

The following player received entry into the singles main draw as a special exempt:
  Lucas Gerch

The following players received entry into the singles main draw as alternates:
  Oleksii Krutykh
  Lucas Miedler

The following players received entry from the qualifying draw:
  Adrian Andreev
  Marius Copil
  Cezar Crețu
  Nicolas Moreno de Alboran
  Mariano Navone
  Giovanni Oradini

The following player received entry as a lucky loser:
  Kenny de Schepper

Champions

Singles

  Cedrik-Marcel Stebe def.  Francesco Passaro 7–6(7–2), 6–4.

Doubles

  Alexander Erler /  Lucas Miedler def.  Dustin Brown /  Julian Lenz 6–1, 7–6(7–3).

References

Città di Como Challenger
2022
2022 in Italian sport
August 2022 sports events in Italy
September 2022 sports events in Italy